El Dorado School District is a public school district based in El Dorado, Arkansas, United States. The El Dorado School District provides early childhood, elementary and secondary education for more than 4,600 prekindergarten through grade 12 students at its eight facilities within Union County, Arkansas.

The district includes all of El Dorado. It also includes the unincorporated areas of Lawson and Urbana.

El Dorado School District is accredited by the Arkansas Department of Education (ADE) with the high school accredited by AdvancED since 1937.

History
In 1978 the Lawson and Urbana school districts merged into the El Dorado district.

Schools 
 Secondary schools
 El Dorado High School—serving more than 1,300 students in grades 9 through 12.
 Barton Junior High School—serving more than 600 students in grades 7 and 8.

 Elementary schools
 Washington Middle School—serving grades 5 and 6.
 Hugh Goodwin Elementary School—serving more than 400 students in kindergarten through grade 4.
 Northwest Elementary School—serving more than 400 students in kindergarten through grade 4.
 Retta Brown Elementary School—serving more than 250 students in kindergarten through grade 4.
 Union Elementary School—serving more than 150 students in kindergarten through grade 6.

References

Further reading
These include maps of predecessor districts:
 (Download)

External links 
 

School districts in Arkansas
Education in Union County, Arkansas